The Damen Group has designed and sold the Damen Stan Patrol 3307 -- part of its family of Damen Stan Patrol vessels of different sizes.

Design

The vessels employ an axe-bow, a new design that Damen claims improves seakeeping. The bow's leading edge is vertical, where most ships have a diagonal leading edge. The diagonal leading edge causes the bow to have more buoyancy when struck by a big wave, which increases the vessel's tendency to pitch and yaw.

The patrol vessel design is based on an earlier fast crew delivery vessel, commonly employed servicing offshore oil platforms.

Operators

References

Damen Group
Patrol vessels